Driftwood is a census-designated place and unincorporated community in northern Hays County, Texas, United States. Per the 2020 census, the population was 106.

Geography
The community has a post office with the ZIP code of 78619.

History
Although the earliest settlers arrived in the area now known as Driftwood around 1850, the community was really established in the 1880s. A post office was among the results of the community's significant growth in that decade. Driftwood shrank almost to a ghost town by the early twentieth century; although it grew somewhat by the middle of the century, it returned to its almost-deserted state by the 1970s.

Driftwood is home to The Salt Lick, a relatively well-known barbecue restaurant, Trattoria Lisina, Driftwood Estate Winery, the Wildflower Barn Event Center, Stonehouse Villa Wedding Venue, Vista Brewing, the Ragland Ranch & Organic Herb Farm and the Lazy 8 Ranch.

Notable people
Bayley Currey, NASCAR driver
Talmadge L. Heflin, former member of the Texas House of Representatives from District 149 in Harris County
Erin Zwiener, current member of the Texas House of Representatives for District 45 in Hays County

References

External links

Profile of Driftwood from the Handbook of Texas Online
Driftwood Community Club

Census-designated places in Hays County, Texas
Census-designated places in Texas
Unincorporated communities in Texas
Census-designated places in Greater Austin